(born August 15, 1963) is a Japanese semi-retired professional wrestler and former Olympic amateur wrestler who is currently a freelancer. He most recently worked for Pro Wrestling Noah. He is a former tag team champion, winning the All Asia Tag Team Championship and GHC Tag Team Championship.

Amateur wrestling career
Tamon Honda began his amateur wrestling career in 1983, while attending Nihon University, competing in freestyle wrestling.

100 kg division
In September 1983, Honda wrestled his first tournament, the World Championship, in Kyiv, U.S.S.R., where he placed in seventh. Two months later, he wrestled at the Asian Championship in Tehran, Iran, where he placed first, earning him a gold medal. In 1984, he wrestled at the 1984 Summer Olympics in Los Angeles, California, where he placed fifth. In May 1985, he wrestled at the World Super Championship in Tokyo, where he placed third, earning him a bronze medal. In October 1986, he wrestled in the Asian Games in Seoul, South Korea, where he placed seventh. In August 1987, he wrestled at the World Championship in Clermont-Ferrand, France, where he placed eleventh. In 1988, he returned to Seoul to wrestle at the 1988 Summer Olympics.

130 kg division
By 1990, Honda moved up from 100 kg to 130 kg. In September 1990, he wrestled at the Asian Games in Beijing, China, where he placed fourth. In April 1992, he wrestled the Asian Championship in Tehran, Iran, where he placed third, earning him a bronze medal. Later that year, he wrestled in the 1992 Summer Olympics in Barcelona, Spain, where he placed eleventh.

Professional wrestling career

All Japan Pro Wrestling (1993–2000)
He almost joined All Japan Pro Wrestling in the 1980s, but it wasn't until after he turned 30 years old that he debuted. Although he never reached the main event level many believed he would, Honda held the All Asia Tag Team Championship twice in the late 1990s.

Pro Wrestling Noah (2000–2010)
After joining Pro Wrestling Noah, he gradually became a regular on the roster, with 2002 and 2003 seeing major progress for him.
Honda left NOAH in January 2010, deciding not to sign a new contract with the promotion and become a freelancer. He still appears on occasion in the promotion.

Family
Honda is married to a piano instructor. He comes from a sporting family. His father Daizaburo was a canoeist who represented Japan in C-2 1000 metres event at the 1964 Tokyo Olympics. His cousin Keisuke Honda is a professional football player who is currently a free agent and is a former Japanese international.

Championships and accomplishments 
All Japan Pro Wrestling
All Asia Tag Team Championship (2 times) – with Jun Izumida and Masao Inoue
All Asia Tag Team League (1999) - with Masao Inoue
Asunaro Cup (1996)

Pro Wrestling Illustrated
 Ranked No. 249 of the top 500 singles wrestlers in the PWI 500 in 2006
Pro Wrestling Noah
GHC Tag Team Championship (2 times) – with Kenta Kobashi
WEW Tag Team Championship (1 time) – with Naomichi Marufuji

Notes

External links 
 

Japanese male professional wrestlers
1963 births
Living people
Sportspeople from Yokohama
Olympic wrestlers of Japan
Wrestlers at the 1984 Summer Olympics
Wrestlers at the 1988 Summer Olympics
Wrestlers at the 1992 Summer Olympics
Japanese male sport wrestlers
Japan Ground Self-Defense Force personnel
Wrestlers at the 1990 Asian Games
Asian Games competitors for Japan
20th-century Japanese people
21st-century Japanese people
GHC Tag Team Champions
All Asia Tag Team Champions
WEW World Tag Team Champions
20th-century professional wrestlers
21st-century professional wrestlers
Asian Wrestling Championships medalists